Aleksander-Heinrich-Johann Silberg (30 April 1869 Narva – 24 January 1926 Tallinn) was a Russian and Estonian military personnel (Major-General).

After graduating from a commerce school in St. Petersburg, he conscripted himself to the Semyonov military unit.

He participated on WW I. In 1917 he has promoted to Major-General. During the war he joined to Nikolai Yudenich's Northwestern Army. In 1920 he moved to Estonia. He become the chief of Military Technology School. Later he become the head of the military company Arsenal. In 1925 he retired. Silberg was buried in Kopli cemetery in the Tallinn suburb of Kopli.

Awards:
 1916: Order of St. George

References

1869 births
1926 deaths
Estonian military personnel
Russian military personnel of World War I